This article is a list of French MPs by Parliament.

List

By year 
 List of deputies of the 11th National Assembly of France (1997 to 2002)
 List of deputies of the 12th National Assembly of France (2002 to 2007
 List of deputies of the 13th National Assembly of France (2007 to 2012
 List of deputies of the 14th National Assembly of France (2012 to 2017)
 List of deputies of the 15th National Assembly of France (2017 to 2022)
 List of deputies of the 16th National Assembly of France (2022 to present)

By department 

 List of deputies from Alpes-de-Haute-Provence
 List of Deputies from Gironde
 List of deputies from Hautes-Alpes
 List of deputies from Savoie

See also 

 Politics of France

National Assembly (France)
French Parliament
Parliamentary history of France